Ivan Tyberiiovych Korponai (born 13 February 1969) was a Ukrainian football striker. He has two brothers Adalbert and Tyberii together with whom he used to play for FC Kremin Kremenchuk.

References
  Profile on the FFU website

1969 births
Living people
Soviet footballers
Ukrainian footballers
Ukrainian expatriate footballers
Expatriate footballers in Kazakhstan
FC Hoverla Uzhhorod players
FC Metalurh Zaporizhzhia players
FC Kremin Kremenchuk players
FC Dnipro players
FC Spartak Ivano-Frankivsk players
FC Atyrau players
FC Chornomorets Odesa players
Ukrainian Premier League players
Association football forwards